The following is a list of organizations associated with the professional field of conservation-restoration.

Professional conservators join and take part in the activities of numerous conservation associations and professional organizations with the wider conservation field, and within their area of specialization.

These organizations exist to "support the conservation professionals who preserve our cultural heritage". This involves upholding professional standards, promoting research and publications, providing educational opportunities, and fostering the exchange of knowledge among conservators, allied professionals, and the public.

 American Institute for Conservation 
 Australian Institute for the Conservation of Cultural Materials
 Digital Preservation Coalition 
 European Confederation of Conservator-Restorers' Organisations
 Institute of Conservation
 International Institute for Conservation
 Intermuseum Conservation Association
 Midwest Regional Conservation Guild 
 Society for the Protection of Ancient Buildings
 Western Association for Art Conservation
 Wyoming Outdoor Council

References

Arts-related lists
Lists of organizations